Lapage is a surname. Notable people with the surname include:

Joseph LaPage (1838–1878), Canadian serial killer
Michael Lapage (1923–2018), English rower

See also
Lepage